Diving at the 2013 Asian Youth Games was held in the Nanjing OSC Natatorium from 17 August to 18 August 2013 in Nanjing, China.

Medalists

Boys

Girls

Medal table

Results

Boys

3 m springboard
17 August

Platform
18 August

Girls

3 m springboard
18 August

Platform
17 August

References
 Boys Springboard Results
 Boys Platform Results
 Girls Springboard Results
 Girls Platform Results

External links
 Official Website

2013 Asian Youth Games events
2013 in diving
2013 Asian Youth Games